The Betaproteobacteria-1 RNA motif is a conserved RNA structure that was discovered by bioinformatics.
Betaproteobacteria-1 motifs are found in betaproteobacteria.
Betaproteobacteria-1 RNAs likely function in trans as sRNAs.
The motif has three pseudoknots in a moderate size of roughly 120 nucleotides on average.

References

Non-coding RNA